The Zoo Licensing Act 1981 (1981 c. 37) was an Act of Parliament in the United Kingdom.

The main effect of the Act was to regulate zoos by requiring them to be licensed by local authorities. The Act did not extend to circuses or pet shops. The Act does not extend to Northern Ireland.

References

Whitaker's Almanack: for the year 1982, complete edition, p. 361. J. Whitaker & Sons, London, 1981

External links

United Kingdom Acts of Parliament 1981